Vojvodić is a surname. Notable people with the surname include:

Branko Vojvodic (born 1985), Serbian rugby union player
Darko Vojvodić (born 1970), Serbian football player and manager
Milan Vojvodić (born 1994), Serbian footballer
Minja Vojvodić (1942–2014), Montenegrin actor

Serbian surnames